James Beg may refer to:

James "Beag" Stewart
James Begg (disambiguation)